Prunum carneum is a species of sea snail, a marine gastropod mollusk in the family Marginellidae, the margin snails.

Description

Distribution
P. carneum can be found in Atlantic waters, ranging from eastern Florida to Venezuela.

References

Marginellidae
Gastropods described in 1837